Belogradchik Municipality is a municipality (obshtina) in Vidin Province, Northwestern Bulgaria, located in the western parts of the so-called Fore-Balkan area. It is named after its administrative centre - the town of Belogradchik. To the west and southwest, the municipality borders on Republic of Serbia.

The municipality is best known with the Belogradchik Rocks,  impressive rock formations located just south of the main town as well as the medieval Belogradchik Fortress situated in the same rocky area. Another place of interest is the Magura Cave, with its beautiful prehistoric cave paintings.

Settlements 

Belogradchik Municipality includes the following 18 places (towns are shown in bold):

Demography 

The following table shows the change of the population during the last four decades.

Religion 
According to the latest Bulgarian census of 2011, the religious composition, among those who answered the optional question on religious identification, was the following:

An overwhelming majority of the population of Belogradchik Municipality identify themselves as Christians. At the 2011 census, 71.7% of respondents identified as Orthodox Christians belonging to the Bulgarian Orthodox Church.

See also
Provinces of Bulgaria
Municipalities of Bulgaria
List of cities and towns in Bulgaria

References

External links
  Website